Stretford is a tram stop on the Altrincham Line of Greater Manchester's light-rail Metrolink system. It is located in Stretford, on the corner of Chester Road and Edge Lane. It opened on 15 June 1992 as part of Phase 1 of Metrolink's expansion.

The stop was formerly Stretford railway station, a regional rail station which was opened by the Manchester South Junction and Altrincham Railway (MSJAR) as Edge Lane railway station on 20 July 1849, was renamed to Stretford in September 1849, and closed on 24 December 1991 for conversion from heavy rail to light rail.

Facilities
There is a large car park for the tram stop on the Manchester-bound platform. Each platform has ticket machines, a waiting shelter and a dot-matrix indicator on each platform. There is step-free access for both platforms from Edge Lane and both platforms have a Touch-In/Out point. There is a bike rack at the station. There is a road bridge over the tracks. This is the only route from one platform to the other.

History

The station originally opened as Edge Lane on 20 July 1849 by the MSJAR, and was renamed Stretford in September 1849. The station operated as a four-platform station from circa 1900 until 1963. Stretford closed as a British Rail station on 24 December 1991 for conversion to Metrolink, and reopened for Metrolink services on 15 June 1992.

Services
Stretford is located on the Altrincham Line, with trams towards Altrincham stopping every 6 minutes during the day, Monday to Saturday, every 12 minutes Monday to Saturday evenings and Sundays. Trams also head towards Manchester and Bury, with the Monday to Saturday daytime service running every 12 minutes each to Piccadilly or Bury, while evening and Sunday journeys run to Piccadilly only.

Service pattern 
10 trams per hour to Altrincham (5 off-peak)
5 trams per hour to Bury (peak only)
5 trams per hour to Piccadilly

Ticket zones 
As of January 2019, Stretford is located in Metrolink ticket zones 2 and 3.

Connecting bus routes
The station is served by: 
Stagecoach Manchester service 15, which runs to Flixton via Urmston and Davyhulme and to Manchester via Hulme.
Stagecoach services 23/23A to the Trafford Centre and to Stockport via Chorlton.
M Travel service 276, which runs to Trafford General Hospital via Urmston and to West Didsbury via Chorlton. 
There are also several services which stop at nearby Stretford Mall, which can connect onto the Metrolink at Stretford.

References

Further reading

External links

Stretford Stop Information
Stretford area map
Visit North West Stretford tram stop information

Tram stops in Trafford
Former Manchester, South Junction and Altrincham Railway stations
Tram stops on the Altrincham to Bury line
Railway stations in Great Britain opened in 1849
Railway stations in Great Britain closed in 1991
Railway stations in Great Britain opened in 1992
Tram stops on the Altrincham to Piccadilly line
Stretford
1849 establishments in England